Norsk Musikforlag Aktieselskap is a Norwegian publisher that specializes in music-related publications such as method books and sheet music. The company was established on January 1, 1909.

References

External links
Norsk Musikforlag website

Publishing companies of Norway
1909 establishments in Norway